Pacific Coast Highway station is a elevated busway station on the J Line of the Los Angeles Metro Busway system. The station is located on the shoulder of Interstate 110 at its intersection with Pacific Coast Highway, after which the station is named, in Los Angeles County, California.

It is one of two stations along the Harbor Freeway are outside of the Harbor Transitway, a shared busway and high occupancy toll lane. South of this station the J Line exits the Harbor Freeway and starts serving San Pedro, starting with the Harbor Beacon Park & Ride. Traveling north on I-110 the next station is Carson. 

The station is located close to Los Angeles Harbor College, Kaiser Permanente South Bay Medical Center, Ken Malloy Harbor Regional Park, and has a 240 space park and ride lot.

Service

Station layout 

The side platforms can be accessed on foot from the Pacific Coast Highway using stairs or elevators. The 240 space park and ride lot is located at Figueroa Street & West Pacific Coast Highway to the east of the station.

Hours and frequency

Connections 
, the following connections are available:
 LADOT Commuter Express: 
 LADOT DASH: Wilmington

References

Los Angeles Metro Busway stations
Carson, California
J Line (Los Angeles Metro)
Transport infrastructure completed in 1996
1996 establishments in California
Bus stations in Los Angeles County, California